The 2020 3. deild karla (English: Men's First Division) is the 66th season of fourth-tier Icelandic football. Twelve teams contested the league. The season began on 18 June.

Teams

League table

Results
Each team will play home and away once against every other team for a total of 22 games each.

References

3. deild karla seasons
4